The 26th Star Screen Awards ceremony honoured the best Indian Hindi-language films released in 2019. The ceremony was held on 2019 and broadcast in India on Star Plus on 2019.

Winners

Main awards

Critics' awards

Special awards

Technical awards

References

Screen Awards
2019 Indian film awards